Marquess of Bolarque is a noble title in the peerage of Spain, bestoweded on Estanislao de Urquijo, 3rd Marquess of Urquijo, by King Alfonso XIII on 24 May 1913. 

The title refers to the area of Salto de Bolarque, in the province of Guadalajara, where Estanislao Urquijo contributed greatly with his industrial work.

Marquesses of Bolarque (1913)

Estanislao de Urquijo y Ussía, 1st Marquess of Bolarque (1872-1948)
Luis de Urquijo y Landecho, 2nd Marquess of Bolarque (1899-1975), eldest son of the 1st Marquess
Juan Ignacio de Urquijo y Eulate, 3rd Marquess of Bolarque (1934-2010), eldest son of the 2nd Marquess
Estanislao de Urquijo y Rubio, 4th Marquess of Bolarque (b. 1963), eldest son of 3rd Marquess

See also
Marquess of Urquijo

References

Bibliography
 

Lists of Spanish nobility
1913 establishments in Spain